{{DISPLAYTITLE:Tommy heavenly6 discography}}

The discography of Japanese pop singer Tomoko Kawase's alter-ego pseudonym Tommy heavenly6 consists of four studio albums, one compilation album, an extended play and 10 singles, released through Defstar Records between 2003 and 2009, and later Warner from 2011 onwards.

Studio albums

Extended plays

Compilation albums

Singles

Promotional singles

Music videos

Guest video appearances

Other appearances

Notes

References

Discographies of Japanese artists
Rock music discographies